The 2022 Rutgers Scarlet Knights football team was an American football team that represented Rutgers University in the East Division of the Big Ten Conference during the 2022 NCAA Division I FBS football season. Greg Schiano was in the third year of his second stint (14th overall season) as Rutgers' head coach.

The Scarlet Knights played their home games at SHI Stadium in Piscataway, New Jersey.

Schedule

Rankings

Roster

Game summaries

at Boston College

Wagner

at Temple

Iowa

at No. 3 Ohio State

Nebraska

Indiana

at Minnesota

No. 5 Michigan

at Michigan State

No. 11 Penn State

at Maryland

References

Rutgers
Rutgers Scarlet Knights football seasons
2022 in sports in New Jersey